George B. Williams was a former West Indian cricket umpire from Trinidad and Tobago. He stood in one Test match, West Indies vs. Pakistan, in 1958.

See also
 List of Test cricket umpires

References

Year of birth missing (living people)
Living people
Place of birth missing (living people)
West Indian Test cricket umpires